is a Japanese footballer.

Career statistics

Club
.

Notes

References

2000 births
Living people
Chukyo University alumni
Japanese footballers
Japanese expatriate footballers
Association football midfielders
Albirex Niigata Singapore FC players
Japanese expatriate sportspeople in Singapore
Expatriate footballers in Singapore